St. Mary's Church, Atherstone is a Grade II* listed parish church in Atherstone, North Warwickshire, England.

The stonework in the tower is in poor condition and hence the church is listed on Historic England's Heritage at Risk Register.

History 

According to Nichols, the chapel was granted to Henry Cartwright in 1542, then left abandoned and neglected until 1692, when Samuel Bracebridge settled a yearly sum for the parson of Mancetter to preach there every other Sunday in the winter season.

After this, St. Mary's Chapel has experienced some form of revival. Its square tower was rebuilt in the fashionable “Gothic” style in 1782. This drastic alteration probably aroused some controversy, although the fine architectural drawing of the chapel made by Jacob Schnebbelie in 1790 prompted Nichols to assert that “the new tower provides a good effect."  St. Mary's was further redesigned in 1849 by Thomas Henry Wyatt and David Brandon.

The chapel was restored to be used as a chancel in 1888.

Organ

The first record of an organ is in 1852, when an instrument by Holdich was installed. This was replaced in 1898, when an organ by Henry Jones and Sons was obtained from Christ Church, South Banbury. A specification of the organ can be found on the National Pipe Organ Register.

References

External links
 

Saint Mary's Church
Structures on the Heritage at Risk register in Warwickshire
13th-century church buildings in England
Grade II* listed churches in Warwickshire
Church of England church buildings in Warwickshire